The 2018 America East men's basketball tournament was the postseason men's basketball tournament for the America East Conference, which was held on March 3, 6, and 10, 2018. All tournament games were played on home arenas of the higher-seeded school. UMBC defeated regular-season champion Vermont in the championship game to win the tournament and receive the conference's automatic bid to the NCAA tournament.  UMBC went on to defeat Virginia to become the first 16th-seeded team to beat the No. 1 seed in one of the biggest upsets in NCAA Tournament history.

Seeds
The top eight teams in the conference standings qualified for the tournament. UMass Lowell was eligible for the tournament for the first time following their four-year transition to Division I. The teams were seeded by record in conference, with a tiebreaker system to seed teams with identical conference records. Binghamton was the only team to not qualify.

Schedule

Bracket and results

Teams are reseeded after each round with highest remaining seeds receiving home court advantage.

See also
 2018 America East women's basketball tournament

References

America East Conference men's basketball tournament
2017–18 America East Conference men's basketball season
2018 in sports in Vermont
Sports competitions in Burlington, Vermont
College basketball tournaments in Vermont